Doug Peacock—born April 5th, 1942—is an American author, filmmaker, wildlife activist, and Vietnam War veteran. He is best known for his work dedicated to grizzly bear recovery in the lower-48, his book Grizzly Years: In Search of the American Wilderness and serving as the model for the well-known character George Washington Hayduke in Edward Abbey's novel The Monkey Wrench Gang. Doug is the co-founder of several conservation organizations including Round River Conservation Studies and Save The Yellowstone Grizzly.  

In 1988 the award winning documentary Peacock’s War  was released about Doug’s experiences in Vietnam and his efforts to study and protect grizzly bears. Peacock's War premiered on PBS Nature, Channel 4 London, and the Discovery Channel. In 2019, Doug starred in a film called Grizzly Country, a follow-up documentary devoted to Doug’s then-and-now war experiences and the evolution of his work with grizzly bears. Grizzly Country was published by The Atlantic Selects, an online showcase of short documentaries curated by The Atlantic. Doug's 2021 film The Beast of Our Time: Grizzly Bears and Climate Change, narrated by Jeff Bridges and scored by Bill Payne, has already won multiple awards and is currently being screened at environmental film festivals nationwide.

Peacock was named 2007 Guggenheim Fellow and was awarded the Cultural Freedom Fellowship by the Lannan Foundation in 2011 for his work on archaeology, climate change and the peopling of North America as published in his 2013 book In the Shadow of the Sabertooth: A Renegade Naturalist Considers Global Warming, the Arrival of the First Americans and the Terrible Beasts of the Pleistocene (Counterpunch/AK Press).

A friend and ally of many acclaimed environmentalists and authors—including Rick Bass, Terry Tempest Williams, Yvon Chouinard, Doug Tompkins, Rick Ridgeway and Edward Abbey—Peacock has devoted a lifetime to advocating for this planet’s wildlife and wild places.

Biography 

Doug Peacock, the son of seasoned naturalists and birders Marion E. and Kathryn L. Peacock, was born in Alma, Michigan where he grew up in the woods, swamps, and trout streams of northern Michigan. He attended the University of Michigan where he brought Martin Luther King Jr. to campus and earned a degree in geology. Doug then served two tours in the Vietnam War as a Green Beret combat medic; he was awarded the Soldier’s Medal, the Vietnamese Cross of Gallantry, and the Bronze Star.

Upon returning home from war, Doug felt disillusioned with human society and sought solace in the beauty of the wilderness. Although he had little scientific background, his passion for and firsthand experience with bears soon brought him recognition as an expert in grizzly behavior. Peacock wrote Grizzly Years: In Search of the American Wilderness in the 70s and 80s. He was a close friend of author Edward Abbey, and served as the model for the character George Hayduke in Abbey's novel The Monkey Wrench Gang.

Peacock's 2005 book, Walking it Off: A Veteran's Chronicle of War And Wilderness, continues his memoirs, in the wake of Ed Abbey's death. He ventured into the southwest deserts to walk off the scars left by his friend's death. In the process, he revisited Vietnam in flashbacks, remembering the cantankerous friendship with Abbey, and almost died in his journey to recover from "this terminal disease called life" in Nepal with his friends Alan Burgess and Dennis Sizemore.

Peacock is also friend of American author Rick Bass. In Bass's book The Lost Grizzlies: A Search for Survivors in the Wilderness of Colorado Peacock is a key element in the search for evidence that there are still grizzlies in the San Juan Mountains.

Peacock was a 2007 Guggenheim fellow, and currently lives in Montana with his wife Andrea, author of Libby, Montana: Asbestos and the Deadly Silence of an American Corporation.  Peacock speaks in  schools about wilderness, conservation, and the need to preserve our wilderness. Doug is the chairman of the board of trustees for Round River Conservation Studies.

Doug and Andrea Peacock's new book, The Essential Grizzly: The Mingled Fates of Men and Bears was released on  May 1, 2006 (Lyons Press). It has been reissued in paperback under a new title, In the Presence of Grizzlies: The Ancient Bond Between Men and Bears in March 2009.  (Lyons Press)

Peacock has more recently been serving as a writer for the Daily Beast, where he writes about the American wilderness as well as animal rights in their indigenous lands. He wrote for The Daily Beast from 2014 through 2019.

Books
 Peacock, Doug. Was It Worth It? A Wilderness Warrior's Long Trail Home, Patagonia Works, 2022. (ISBN 978-1-952338-04-5)
 Peacock, Doug. Grizzly Years: In Search of the American Wilderness, Henry Holt & Co., 1990. 
 Peacock, Doug. Baja, Bulfinch Press, 1991 
 Peacock, Doug. Walking It Off: A Veteran's Chronicle of War And Wilderness, Ewu Press, 2005. 
 Peacock, Doug and Edward Abbey. "The Best of Edward Abbey", Sierra Club Books, 2005
 Peacock, Doug and Andrea Peacock. The Essential Grizzly: The Mingled Fates of Men and Bears, Lyons Press, 2006.
 Peacock, Doug.  In the Shadow of the Sabertooth: A Renegade Naturalist Considers Global Warming, the First Americans, and the Terrible Beasts of the Pleistocene.  AK Press, 2013. 

References

"Q&A: Doug Peacock,Veteran of the Grizzly Wars", National Geographic Adventure Magazine, July/August 2002.UCSC Currents online
Newman, John. "Nature writer Doug Peacock to tell of grizzlies, wilderness, and survival", UC Santa Cruz, Currents online, April 23, 2001.
"Doug Peacock". The Daily Beast. Retrieved November 8, 2021.

External links
Doug Peacock Official Website
Author papers at Southwest Collection/Special Collections Library, Texas Tech University

National Geographic Adventure Questions and Answers with Doug Peacock, at National Geographic Adventure.
Doug Peacock: The World Needs Ed Abbey Now at New West Network.
 Doug Peacock on “Walking It Off: A Veteran’s Chronicle of War and Wilderness” on Democracy Now! May 12, 2009

Living people
American conservationists
American naturalists
American nature writers
American male non-fiction writers
American memoirists
United States Army personnel of the Vietnam War
Members of the United States Army Special Forces
Writers from Montana
University of Michigan alumni
United States Army soldiers
Year of birth missing (living people)